With a Smile and a Song is an album featuring Doris Day and Jimmy Joyce and the Children's Chorus, recorded from July 7 to 14, 1964 and released by Columbia Records on October 19, 1964. It was issued as a monophonic album (catalog number CL-2266) and a stereophonic album (catalog number CS-9066). Allyn Ferguson arranged and conducted the album.

Track listing
"Give a Little Whistle"  (Leigh Harline, Ned Washington) - 2:07
"The Children's Marching Song (Nick Nack Paddy Whack)" - 1:54
"Getting to Know You" (Richard Rodgers, Oscar Hammerstein II) - 3:05
"Zip-a-dee-doo-dah" (Allie Wrubel, Ray Gilbert) - 1:57
"The Lilac Tree" (George H. Gartlan) - 2:02
"High Hopes" (Jimmy Van Heusen, Sammy Cahn) - 2:17
"Do-Re-Mi" (Richard Rodgers, Oscar Hammerstein II) - 2:21
"Whatever Will Be, Will Be (Que Sera, Sera)" (Jay Livingston, Ray Evans) (1964 Remake)  
"The Inch-worm" (Frank Loesser) 
"Swinging on a Star" (Jimmy Van Heusen, Johnny Burke)
"Sleepy Baby" (Martin Broones, Paul Francis Webster) 
"With a Smile and a Song" (Leigh Harline, Frank Churchill)

1964 albums
Doris Day albums
Columbia Records albums
albums arranged by Allyn Ferguson